Good-bye, My Lady is a 1956 American drama film adaptation of the novel Good-bye, My Lady (1954) by James H. Street. The book had been inspired by Street's original 1941 story which appeared in The Saturday Evening Post. Street was going to be the principal advisor on the film when he suddenly died of a heart attack. A boy learns what it means to be a man by befriending and training a stray Basenji dog and then is forced to surrender her to its rightful owner. Both readers of the story and film-goers found the boy's eventual loss of the dog unexpected.

Directed by William A. Wellman, the film starred Walter Brennan and Brandon deWilde, with Sidney Poitier and Phil Harris in supporting roles. Brennan and Harris previously co-starred in 1951's The Wild Blue Yonder, and Brennan and deWilde would reunite for the cameras in 1965 for Disney in Those Calloways. That same year, deWilde would play producer John Wayne's son in In Harm's Way. The film was produced by John Wayne's Batjac Productions.

Plot
Young orphan boy Skeeter (Brandon deWilde) is being raised in a Mississippi swamp cabin by his poor and toothless Uncle Jesse Jackson (Walter Brennan). One night, a mysterious noise is heard. They later discover that the noise was caused by a strange breed of dog (My Lady of the Congo) they do not recognize. Rather than a bark, the dog has a yodel or laugh. The animal has keen senses, and they decide to train her for bird hunting.

In time, Skeeter learns that an ad had been placed for a female Basenji which had been lost in their swamp months earlier. Skeeter arranges for a telegram to be sent, and a representative (William Hopper) of the dog's rightful owner appears to take it back. Skeeter is forced to "come of age" and surrender the animal. With the $100 reward money given, he is able to purchase Jesse the false teeth that he needs and put a down payment on a 20 gauge shotgun.

Cast
 Walter Brennan as Uncle Jesse Jackson
 Phil Harris as Cash Evans
 Brandon deWilde as Claude "Skeeter" Jackson
 Sidney Poitier as Gates Watson
 William Hopper as Walden Grover
 Louise Beavers as Bonnie Drew

The dog
Chosen for the film was My Lady of the Congo, a six-month-old Basenji puppy of Miss Veronica Tudor-Williams of Molesey, England. My Lady was flown to Hollywood, to be followed later by four young dogs as doubles, including her little brother My Lord of the Congo and Flageolet of the Congo, subsequently an International Champion. As it was, My Lady wound up doing most of the scenes. When not filming with then 13-year-old deWilde, the dog spent all her time with him, and an attachment developed between them. Unknown to theater-goers that saw boy and dog parted in the film was the fact that the written agreement supplying the animal stated that My Lady would become the personal property of Brandon deWilde upon completion of filming.

The rare breed of dog had been unknown to most Americans. Affected by either the story, the novel or the movie, many people were inclined to become Basenji owners at this time.

Music
Song: "When Your Boy Becomes a Man". Music by Don Powell, lyrics by Moris Erby.

Home media
Good-bye, My Lady was originally released on VHS in the United States by Warner Home Video, on December 13, 1993. On December 10, 2010, Warner Archive Collection released Good-bye, My Lady as a manufactured on-demand remastered wide-screen DVD-R release.

In an interview for Turner Classic Movies, Gretchen Wayne, the daughter-in-law of John Wayne and current president of Batjac Productions, was asked about a DVD. "I'm not sure who owns Good-bye, My Lady -- it might be Warner Brothers. It's a charming story and it should be released," she said.

See also
 List of American films of 1956

References

External links
 
 
 
 

1956 films
1950s coming-of-age drama films
Batjac Productions films
American coming-of-age drama films
Films about dogs
Films about orphans
Films based on American novels
Films produced by John Wayne
Warner Bros. films
1956 drama films
1950s English-language films
Films directed by William A. Wellman
1950s American films
American black-and-white films